The Moín Container Terminal, officially known in Spanish as  is a container port in the Limón province of Costa Rica.  Not to be confused with the Port of Moín, operated by JAPDEVA.

History 

Its construction started in early 2015, and is currently operated by concession of the government by the APM Terminals company. It is the first artificial island created in the country

The first vessel to arrive was CAP BEATRICE on 27 October 2018, before its inauguration in February 2019.

Route 257 is a road that was built and designated a national route, to connect Route 32 to the port.

See also 
 Port of Limón, operated by JAPDEVA
 Port of Moín, operated by JAPDEVA

References

External links
 Moín - APM Terminals

Port settlements in Central America
Transport in Costa Rica
Buildings and structures in Limón Province
Container terminals